Torrence Allen is an American football wide receiver who is a free agent. He was born in Clifton, Texas, and attended Meridian High School in Meridian, Texas. He graduated from West Texas A&M University. As a senior, he was a Lone Star Conference co-receiver of the year, all-conference first-team, and Daktronics All-Super Region Four player. He has spent time with the San Diego Chargers.

Professional career 
On May 13, 2014, Allen signed with the San Diego Chargers as an undrafted free agent. On August 31, he was cut but signed to the practice squad the next day. On December 29, 2014, Allen signed a reserve/future contract.

On September 1, 2015, Allen was waived with an injury designation after suffering a foot injury and was placed on injured reserve the next day. On January 2, 2016, he was cut but signed a reserve/future contract three days later.

On August 29, 2016, he was cut.

References

External links
 San Diego Chargers bio

1991 births
Living people
American football wide receivers
West Texas A&M Buffaloes football players
People from Clifton, Texas